Horní Měcholupy is a cadastral area in Prague.

References

External links 

 

Districts of Prague